Basis trading is a financial trading strategy which consists of the purchase of a particular financial instrument or commodity and the sale of its related derivative  (for example the purchase of a particular bond and the sale of a related futures contract).

Basis trading is done when the investor feels that the two instruments are mispriced relative to one other and that the mispricing will correct itself so that the gain on one side of the trade will more than cancel out the loss on the other side of the trade. In the case of such a trade taking place on a security and its related futures contract, the trade will be profitable if the purchase price plus the net cost of carry is less than the futures price.

Basis of futures
Basis can be defined as the difference between the spot price of a given cash market asset and the price of its related futures contract. There will be a different basis for each delivery month for each contract. Usually, basis is defined as cash price minus futures price, however, the alternative definition, future price minus cash, is also used.  A basis trade profits from the closing of an unwarranted gap between the futures contract and the associated cash market instrument.

See also
Basis swap

References

Derivatives (finance)